Thyatira is an unincorporated community in eastern Tate County, Mississippi, United States.  It is located approximately 11 miles east of the county seat of Senatobia and 21 miles west of Holly Springs in Marshall County. The main thoroughfare is Mississippi Highway 4. Thyatira is home to two of the oldest Churches of Christ on record in the state, both of which bear the same name: Thyatira Church of Christ. It lies at an elevation of 371 feet (131 m).

References

Unincorporated communities in Tate County, Mississippi
Unincorporated communities in Mississippi
Memphis metropolitan area